Lost Highway is the soundtrack album for the 1997 David Lynch film of the same name. It was produced by Trent Reznor (Nine Inch Nails), and includes original music from the film recorded by Reznor, Angelo Badalamenti and Barry Adamson, as well as songs by other artists used in the film. The album reached No. 7 on the Billboard 200 and reached Gold status in the United States.

On 7 November 2016 the album was rereleased on vinyl by Dutch label Music On Vinyl.

Track listing
 "I'm Deranged" (edit) – David Bowie – 2:37
 "Videodrones; Questions" – Trent Reznor featuring Peter Christopherson – 0:44
 "The Perfect Drug" – Nine Inch Nails – 5:42
 "Red Bats with Teeth" – Angelo Badalamenti – 2:57
 "Haunting & Heartbreaking" – Angelo Badalamenti – 2:09
 "Eye" – The Smashing Pumpkins – 4:51
 "Dub Driving" – Angelo Badalamenti – 3:43
 "Mr. Eddy's Theme 1" – Barry Adamson – 3:31
 "This Magic Moment" – Lou Reed – 3:23
 "Mr. Eddy's Theme 2" – Barry Adamson – 2:13
 "Fred & Renee Make Love" – Angelo Badalamenti – 2:04
 "Apple of Sodom" – Marilyn Manson – 4:26
 "Insensatez" – Antônio Carlos Jobim – 2:53
 "Something Wicked This Way Comes" (edit) – Barry Adamson – 2:54
 "I Put a Spell on You" – Marilyn Manson – 3:30
 "Fats Revisited" – Angelo Badalamenti – 2:31
 "Fred's World" – Angelo Badalamenti – 3:01
 "Rammstein" (edit) – Rammstein – 3:26
 "Hollywood Sunset" – Barry Adamson – 2:01
 "Heirate Mich" (edit) – Rammstein – 3:02
 "Police" – Angelo Badalamenti – 1:40
 "Driver Down" – Trent Reznor – 5:18
 "I'm Deranged" (reprise) – David Bowie – 3:48

Certifications

Notes
 "Song to the Siren" by This Mortal Coil is used in the film, but was not included on the soundtrack album.
 Additional production on "Videodrones; Questions" and "Driver Down" by Peter Christopherson.
 The songs which have been edited for the soundtrack can be heard as originally recorded on these albums:
 David Bowie: "I'm Deranged" from Outside (1995).
 Barry Adamson: "Something Wicked This Way Comes" from Oedipus Schmoedipus (1996).
 Rammstein: "Rammstein" and "Heirate Mich" from Herzeleid (1995).
 Marilyn Manson: "I Put a Spell on You" from Smells Like Children (1995).

References

1990s film soundtrack albums
Albums produced by Trent Reznor
Lost Highway Soundtrack
Interscope Records soundtracks
Rock soundtracks
Trent Reznor soundtracks
Nothing Records soundtracks